Euxanthe tiberius is a butterfly in the family Nymphalidae. It is found in Kenya and Tanzania. The habitat consists of lowland evergreen forests, including coastal forests.

Both sexes are attracted to fermenting bananas.

The larvae feed on Deinbollia species.

Subspecies
Euxanthe tiberius subsp. tiberius – coast of Kenya, eastern and north-eastern Tanzania
Euxanthe tiberius subsp. meruensis van Someren, 1936 – Kenya: eastern and north-eastern slopes of Mount Kenya

References

External links
BOLD images

Butterflies described in 1889
Charaxinae
Butterflies of Africa
Taxa named by Henley Grose-Smith